Thou Art a Vineyard is a medieval Georgian hymn. The text is attributed to King Demetrius I of Georgia (1093–1156). The composer of the music is unknown. Supposedly Demetrius I wrote it during his confinement as a monk in the David Gareja Monastery. The hymn is dedicated to Georgia and the patronage of the Virgin Mary; it is also a prayer of praise to Mary in the Georgian Orthodox Church.

As the lyrics did not mention any saints or gods, this was the only church-song that was permitted to be performed in the anti-religious Soviet Union. There are East Georgian (Kartli-Kakhetian) and West Georgian (Gurian) versions of this chant with very different musical compositions.

Thou Art a Vineyard is usually sung by a choir without instrumental accompaniment and is a classic example of Georgian choral music. The hymn is representative of the late Medieval traditions of the Georgian Renaissance.

Text

Popular culture
It was performed in a Georgian 1969 film, Don't Grieve.

Its rendition can be heard in 'The Poet in the Prince's Court' segment of the Soviet Armenian film The Color of Pomegranates.

This hymn is used as one of Georgia's musical themes in the video-game expansion, Civilization VI: Rise and Fall.

A rendition is used as the main theme for the YouTube Web Series, Journey in Classic Era.

References

External links
The Recovering Choir Director
"You Are the Vineyard, Newly Blossomed: Contemporary Performance Aesthetics in Georgian Orthodox Chant"

Middle Georgian literature
Eastern Christian hymns
Christian chants
Georgian words and phrases
Songs of Georgia (country)